Pavol Hrušovský (born 9 June 1952) was the Speaker of the National Council of the Slovak Republic (the Slovak parliament) from 15 October 2002 to 7 February 2006 and party leader of the Christian Democratic Movement (2000–2009).

Professional career
In 1978 he earned his degree at the Law Faculty of Comenius University in Bratislava, Slovakia.

After the conclusion of his study he worked in various economic organizations as a lawyer. In 1989 he became the head of the Legal Department of the "Jednota SD" cooperative in Nitra. In 1992 he became the head of the District Council in Nitra.

In 1989 he was co-opted for a deputy of the Federal Assembly (federal parliament) of Czechoslovakia. In the 1990 election, he was elected as a deputy of the Assembly, in which he worked in the Constitutional, Foreign Relations and Mandate and Immunity Committees.

Since the election in 1992 he has been a Member of the Slovak parliament. During the first election term of the National Council of the Slovak Republic (Slovak parliament) he was a member of the Constitutional and Mandate and Immunity Committees.
In the second term he was a Deputy Speaker of the National Council.
At the constituent session of the third election term he has been elected Speaker of the National Council.

Political career

He entered politics after November 1989 and he became engaged in the Christian Democratic Movement, a member of which he has remained to this day.

In the September 1998 election he ran for the Parliament for the Slovak Democratic Coalition.

He was a member of the coalition from July 1998 to March 1999.
In April 1999 at the Christian Democratic Movement convention, he was elected deputy leader of the movement for domestic politics.
At the Christian Democratic Movement convention in Trenčín on 21 October 2000, he was elected the leader of Christian Democratic Movement. He replaced Ján Čarnogurský, who had been the leader of the Christian Democratic Movement since its inception (i.e. for ten years).

References

1952 births
Christian Democratic Movement politicians
Living people
People from Nové Zámky District
Speakers of the National Council (Slovakia)
Candidates for President of Slovakia
Members of the National Council (Slovakia) 1992-1994
Members of the National Council (Slovakia) 1994-1998
Members of the National Council (Slovakia) 1998-2002
Members of the National Council (Slovakia) 2002-2006
Members of the National Council (Slovakia) 2006-2010
Members of the National Council (Slovakia) 2010-2012
Members of the National Council (Slovakia) 2012-2016